Yevgeny Aleksandrovich Kozlovsky (7 May 1929 – 20 February 2022) was a Russian politician. A member of the Communist Party of the Soviet Union, he served as Minister of Geology from 1975 to 1989. 

Kozlovsky died on 20 February 2022, at the age of 92.

References

1929 births
2022 deaths
People from Gomel Region
Central Committee of the Communist Party of the Soviet Union candidate members
Communist Party of the Soviet Union members
Tenth convocation members of the Supreme Soviet of the Soviet Union
Eleventh convocation members of the Soviet of Nationalities
Recipients of the Order "For Merit to the Fatherland", 3rd class
Recipients of the Order "For Merit to the Fatherland", 4th class
Lenin Prize winners
Recipients of the Order of Lenin
Recipients of the Order of the Red Banner of Labour
State Prize of the Russian Federation laureates

Russian people of Belarusian descent
Russian geologists
Soviet geologists
Soviet politicians
Burials in Troyekurovskoye Cemetery